The President of the Principality of Asturias is the head of government of the Spanish autonomous community of Asturias. The president is chosen by the General Junta of the Principality of Asturias, autonomous parliamentary institution.

Election
The president is elected after the constitution of the General Junta or after the cessation of the former president.

A deputy can be nominated as candidate only if at least five members propose him.

During the Investiture proceedings the nominees present their political agenda in an Investiture Speech to be debated and submitted for a Vote of Confidence by the General Junta, effecting an indirect election of the head of government. A simple majority confirms the nominee and his program. At the moment of the vote, the confidence is awarded if the candidate receives a majority of votes in the first poll (currently 23 out of 45 deputies), but if the confidence is not awarded, a second vote is scheduled two days later in which a simple majority of votes cast (i.e., more "yes" than "no" votes) is required.

Headquarters
The headquarters of the President of the Principality of Asturias are located in Oviedo. The building is in the back part of the General Junta of the Principality of Asturias and both buildings are connected by an underground passage.

The building was formerly the seat of the Bank of Spain in Oviedo until 1982

The Principality of Asturias acquired the building 1982 and reformed it for its current use between 1983 and 1985.

List of officeholders
Governments:

Timeline

Notes

References

See also
General Junta of the Principality of Asturias
Government of the Principality of Asturias

 
Politics of Spain